The Hong-Gah Museum or Feng-jia Museum is a museum in Beitou District, Taipei, Taiwan.

History
The Hong-gah Museum was opened on 25 October 1999. On 25 October 2003, the museum officially became a Local Community Museum of the Council for Cultural Affairs.

Transportation
The museum is accessible within walking distance West from Qiyan Station of the Taipei Metro.

See also
 List of museums in Taiwan

References

External links
  

1999 establishments in Taiwan
Local museums in Taiwan
Museums established in 1999
Museums in Taipei